The Celebrity Series of Boston is a non-profit performing arts presenter established in Boston, Massachusetts by Boston impresario Aaron Richmond in 1938 as Aaron Richmond's Celebrity Series. Since its founding the Celebrity Series has evolved into one of New England's major presenting organizations with over 100 performance and outreach activities annually.

History
From its inception the Celebrity Series became a mainstay of Boston's cultural life with performances by a wide variety of noted performers. Below is a partial list of performers by genre presented by the Celebrity Series of Boston since its founding:

Music performances

Pianists in Recital

 Claudio Arrau
 Daniel Barenboim
 Alfred Brendel
 Van Cliburn
 Leon Fleisher
 Boris Goldovsky
 Richard Goode
 Judith Gordon
 Glenn Gould
 Horacio Gutierrez
 Vladimir Horowitz
 Evgeny Kissin
 Robert Levin
 Radu Lupu
 Moura Lympany
 Olivier Messiaen (piano duo with Yvonne Loriod)
 Arturo Benedetti Michelangeli
 Garrick Ohlsson
 Ignace Jan Paderewski
 Murray Perahia
 Maurizio Pollini
 Awadagin Pratt
 Sergei Rachmaninoff
 Sviatoslav Richter
 Artur Rubinstein
 Sergey Schepkin
 Andras Schiff
 Rudolf Serkin
 Russell Sherman
 Jan Smeterlin
 Solomon
 Dubravka Tomsic
 Daniil Trifonov
 André Watts
 Krystian Zimerman

Violinists in Recital

 Joshua Bell
 Adolf Busch
 Mischa Elman
 Hilary Hahn
 Jascha Heifetz
 Fritz Kreisler
 Yehudi Menuhin
 Midori
 Nathan Milstein
 Anne-Sophie Mutter
 Itzhak Perlman
 Gil Shaham
 Isaac Stern
 Josef Szigeti
 Efrem Zimbalist

Cellists in Recital

 Matt Haimovitz
 Lynn Harrell
 Yo-Yo Ma
 Gregor Piatigorsky
 Jacqueline du Pré
 Mstislav Rostropovich
 Alisa Weilerstein

Classical vocalists in Recital

 Marian Anderson
 Cecilia Bartoli
 Pierre Bernac with Francis Poulenc
 Benjamin Britten with tenor Peter Pears
 Maria Callas
 Renée Fleming
 Roland Hayes
 Marilyn Horne
 Dawn Upshaw
 Lorraine Hunt Lieberson
 Birgit Nilsson
 Jessye Norman
 Luciano Pavarotti
 Ezio Pinza
 Lily Pons
 Leontyne Price
 Elisabeth Schwarzkopf
 Beverly Sills
 Dawn Upshaw
 Deborah Voigt

Guitarists in Recital

 Andrés Segovia
 Carlos Montoya
 Christopher Parkening
 John Williams
 Julian Bream

Orchestras

 Atlanta Symphony Orchestra
 Baltimore Symphony Orchestra
 BBC Symphony
 Berlin Philharmonic
 Chicago Symphony Orchestra
 Cincinnati Symphony Orchestra
 Cleveland Orchestra
 Detroit Symphony
 Dresden Staatskapelle
 Hague Philharmonic
 Houston Symphony
 Israel Philharmonic
 Leipzig Gewandhaus Orchestra
 London Symphony Orchestra
 Los Angeles Philharmonic
 Minneapolis Symphony Orchestra
 Moscow Philharmonic
 National Symphony Orchestra
 NBC Symphony Orchestra
 New Philharmonia Orchestra of London
 New York Philharmonic
 L'Orchestre du Capitole de Toulouse
 L'Orchestre de la Suisse Romande
 Orchestre de Paris
 Orchestre National de France
 Philadelphia Orchestra
 Pittsburgh Symphony Orchestra
 Royal Concertgebouw Orchestra
 Royal Philharmonic Orchestra
 San Francisco Symphony
 St. Petersburg Philharmonic (and Leningrad Philharmonic)
 Stockholm Philharmonic
 Vienna Philharmonic
 Vienna Symphony Orchestra
 Warsaw Philharmonic

Conductors

 André Previn
 Antal Doráti
 Arturo Toscanini
 Bernard Haitink
 Carlo Maria Giulini
 Charles Dutoit
 Charles Münch
 Christoph von Dohnányi
 Claudio Abbado
 Daniel Barenboim
 Dennis Russell Davies
 Edo de Waart
 Eduard van Beinum
 Eugene Ormandy
 Frans Brüggen
 George Szell
 Gil Rose
 Herbert Blomstedt
 Herbert von Karajan
 Igor Stravinsky (conducting his own works)
 Karl Böhm
 Kurt Masur
 Leonard Bernstein
 Leonard Slatkin
 Leopold Stokowski
 Lorin Maazel
 Mariss Jansons
 Michael Tilson Thomas
 Mstislav Rostropovich
 Neville Marriner
 Nikolaus Harnoncourt
 Pierre Boulez
 Pierre Monteux
 Rafael Frühbeck de Burgos
 Rafael Kubelík
 Riccardo Chailly
 Seiji Ozawa
 Sir Georg Solti
 Vladimir Ashkenazy
 Vladimir Spivakov
 Wilhelm Furtwängler
 Wolfgang Sawallisch
 Yehudi Menuhin
 Yuri Temirkanov
 Zubin Mehta

Chamber Ensembles

 Academy of St Martin in the Fields
 Alban Berg Quartet
 Amadeus Quartet
 Artemis String Quartet
 Beaux Arts Trio
 Béla Bartók (with Benny Goodman and Josef Szigeti)
 Berlin Philharmonic Octet
 Borromeo String Quartet
 Boston Musica Viva
 Budapest String Quartet
 eighth blackbird
 Emerson String Quartet
 ETHEL 
 Guarneri Quartet
 I Musici
 I Solisti de Zagreb
 Juilliard String Quartet
 Kalichstein-Laredo-Robinson Trio
 Kronos Quartet
 Los Angeles Guitar Quartet
 Music from Marlboro
 Mutter-Previn-Harrell Trio
 New England String Ensemble
 Orpheus Chamber Orchestra
 Paganini Quartet
 Quartetto Italiano
 Reginald Kell Chamber Players
 Romeros Guitar Quartet
 St. Lawrence String Quartet
 Takács Quartet
 Tokyo String Quartet
 Trieste Trio
 Triple Helix
 Vienna Octet
 Virtuosi di Roma

Jazz Performers

 Benny Goodman (with Béla Bartók and violinist Josef Szigeti)
 Bobby McFerrin
 Terence Blanchard
 Lester Bowie
 Dave Brubeck
 Chick Corea
 Dave Holland
 Diana Krall
 Dizzy Gillespie
 Herbie Hancock
 Vijay Iyer
 Charles Lloyd
 Gerry Mulligan
 Joe Lovano
 Christian McBride
 Maria Schneider Orchestra
 Mel Tormé
 Mingus Big Band
 Modern Jazz Quartet
 Preservation Hall Jazz Band
 Branford Marsalis
 Wynton Marsalis
 Cecile McLorin Salvant
 SFJAZZ Collective

Miscellaneous Musical Performers

 Burl Ives
 Joni Mitchell
 Maurice Chevalier
 Kathy Mattea
 Ravi Shankar
 The Chieftains
 Trapp Family Singers
 Victor Borge
 Rob Kapilow, Family Musik and What Makes It Great?
 Del McCoury

Dance Performances

 Agnes de Mille Dance Theatre
 Alvin Ailey American Dance Theater
 American Ballet Theatre
 Ballet Folklorico de Mexico
 Ballet Russe de Monte Carlo
 BeijingDance/LDTX
 Bejart Ballet of the Twentieth Century
 Bolshoi Ballet
 Dance Theatre of Harlem
 Destine Haitian Dance Company
 Geoffrey Holder Dance Company
 Hubbard Street Dance Chicago
 Iva Kitchell
 Joffrey Ballet
 Jooss European Ballet
 Jose Greco & his Spanish Dancers
 Jose Limón Dance Company
 Katherine Dunham
 Kirov Ballet
 Mark Morris Dance Group
 Martha Graham and Company
 Merce Cunningham Dance Company
 Moiseyev Dance Company
 Original Ballet Russe
 Paul Taylor Dance Company
 Pearl Primus Dance Company
 Pilobolus (dance company)
 Sadlers Wells Ballet/Royal Ballet
 Sankai Juku
 Seán Curran Company
 Trudi Schoop and her Dancing Comedians
 Twyla Tharp Dance
 Uday Shankar and his Hindu Ballet

Theatre/Spoken Word Performances

 Alexander McCall Smith
 Basil Twist
 Bette Davis
 Bristol Old Vic
 Carol Burnett
 Cornelia Otis Skinner
 Dame Judith Anderson as Hamlet
 David Rakoff
 David Sedaris
 Emlyn Williams as Charles Dickens
 Frank Rich
 Garrison Keillor
 Hal Holbrook in "Mark Twain Tonight!"
 Ira Glass
 Ruth Draper
 Sarah Vowell
 Sir Thomas Beecham
 Spalding Gray
 Terry Gross

Boston debuts
Many nationally and internationally recognized artists have made their Boston debuts with the Celebrity Series. They include:

 Alvin Ailey American Dance Theater
 Cellist Yo-Yo Ma
 Flutist Jean-Pierre Rampal
 Pianist Emanuel Ax
 Dance Theatre of Harlem
 Wynton Marsalis Septet
 Mitsuko Shirai
 Bournemouth Symphony Orchestra
 Hagen Quartet
 Roby Lakatos Ensemble
 Calgary Philharmonic Orchestra
 Orpheus Chamber Orchestra
 Baritone Thomas Hampson
 Jazz at Lincoln Center Orchestra (Jazz at Lincoln Center)
 Soprano Dawn Upshaw
 Mezzo-soprano Cecilia Bartoli
 Violinist Nadja Salerno-Sonnenberg
 Aszure Barton and Artists
 Circa
 BeijingDance/LDTX
 Violinist Joshua Bell
 Emerson String Quartet
 Sächsische Staatskapelle Dresden
 Soprano Leontyne Price
 Pianist Angela Hewitt
 Pianist Ingrid Fliter
 Inbal Pinto & Avshalom Pollak Dance Company
 Pianist Paul Lewis
 The Goat Rodeo Sessions

Each season from early fall to late spring, the Celebrity Series presents more than 50 multi-cultural and international artists and performing ensembles to audiences in the greater Boston area. By utilizing a number of different performance venues throughout the Boston area, each year the Celebrity Series presents programs of classical music, modern and classical dance, jazz, folk, world music, family music and multi-media performances.

The Celebrity Series has operated under a number of organizational umbrellas. In 1938, Aaron Richmond founded Aaron Richmond's Celebrity Series.
 In 1953, it affiliated with Boston University and took the name, the Boston University Celebrity Series. In 1984, the Celebrity Series changed affiliations and moved its operations under the auspices of the Wang Center for the Performing Arts a not-for-profit institution. Then, in 1989, the Celebrity Series incorporated as an independent, non-profit institution with its own Board of Directors and an annual budget of over $3 million (now  between $6 million and $7 million). After 18 years of operating with the title sponsorship support of Bank of Boston, BankBoston, FleetBoston Financial, and Bank of America, the Celebrity Series began operating under its incorporated name, Celebrity Series of Boston, in June 2007.

Leadership

Leadership of the Celebrity Series has remained consistent over its lifetime. In 1958, Aaron Richmond hired Walter Pierce as a Programming Associate. Pierce later became Executive Director and guided the Series from an impresario-style presenter to a fully staffed, not-for-profit organization. In 1986, Mr. Pierce hired Martha H. Jones as the Series' Director of Marketing. Jones later became General Manager, and, in 1996, when Mr. Pierce retired his full-time post, Martha Jones was appointed Executive Director. Ms. Jones retired in 2011. She was succeeded by Gary Dunning.

In 1971, the Celebrity Series merged with the Boston Opera Association. During this time, Walter Pierce worked closely with Harriet O’Brien, managing director of the Boston Opera Association, sponsors of the annual one-week Boston engagement of the Metropolitan Opera. Following Ms. O’Brien’s death, Mr. Pierce managed the Metropolitan Opera week in Boston until the company ceased touring.

In 1998, a gala concert in honor of Walter Pierce was staged at Boston's Symphony Hall. It was announced during the festivities that seat P-1 in Symphony Hall had been endowed in Pierce's name and that the Celebrity Series had formed the Walter Pierce Annual Performance Fund. Among the performers were pianist Dubravka Tomsic, who played Liszt's Mephisto Waltz; flutist Jean-Pierre Rampal with pianist John Steel Ritter, who played Beethoven's Three National Airs with Variations, Opus 107; William Bolcom and Joan Morris, who performed Billy Desmond and Walter Dore's song, "When Are You Going to Lead Me to the Altar, Walter?"; the Juilliard String Quartet, a trio of pianist Emanuel Ax, violinist Isaac Stern, and cellist Yo-Yo Ma, and Nasha Thomas-Schmitt of the Alvin Ailey American Dance Theater, who danced Alvin Ailey's solo piece "Cry.". At the dinner following the performance, soprano Leontyne Price sang an impromptu version of "This Little Light of Mine" for Pierce.

Programs

Arts for All!
The Celebrity Series operates one of the most extensive education and community service programs in New England. Launched in the mid-1980s, Arts for All! has grown from a small, school-based ticket giveaway program reaching 200 people a year to an innovative outreach program reaching thousands of individuals each year with a series of residency programs, master classes, workshops and interactive concerts for students, families, seniors, and special needs groups. The Celebrity Series works with hundreds of community-based organizations who each month receive mailings detailing upcoming Arts for All! activities and ticket programs in which they are able to participate. The programs major components are the Take Your Seat discount ticketing program, the Neighborhood Arts free community concerts and workshops, Artist Connections master classes, and Public Performance Projects.

Between 90,000 and 100,000 individuals attend Celebrity Series concerts each year. While audiences come from as far north as Maine and as far south as New Jersey, the majority come from the greater Boston metropolitan area. The Celebrity Series – through the Arts for All! program – attempts to ensure that its audience is ethnically diverse and includes people from all age groups and socio-economic backgrounds.

The Debut Series

Launched in 2012, The Debut Series presents classical musicians in the early stages of their careers in the intimate setting of Pickman Hall at Longy School of Music of Bard College.

A Partial List of Performers on the Debut Series

 Inon Barnatan
 Cantus
 Daniil Trifonov
 Danish String Quartet
 Sol Gabetta
 Pacifica String Quartet
 Anthony McGill
 Pavel Haas Quartet
 Benjmain Grosvenor
 Igor Levitt
 Jennifer Koh
 Shai Wosner
 Tara Erraught
 Denis Kozhukin
 Paul Appleby
 Vilde Frang
 Milos
 Susanna Phillips
 Nicholas Phan
 Beatrice Rana

Public Performance Projects
Celebrity Series’ free outdoor participatory public art projects were launched in 2013 in celebration of the organization’s 75th anniversary season. In 2013, international conceptual artist Luke Jerram was engaged to bring Play Me I’m Yours, Street Pianos to Boston, which placed 75 playable, visually redesigned pianos in outdoor and publicly accessible locations throughout the city over an 18-day festival. In 2014, Montreal-based choreographer Sylvain Emard led 110 local volunteer amateur dancers and 5,000+ audience members for three nights of live performances of Le Grand Continental in Boston’s Copley Square. In 2015, 5,000+ residents and visitors came together for Let’s Dance Boston, five nights of social dancing and live music on Boston’s Rose Kennedy Greenway.

Stave Sessions
Stave Sessions is a five-night music festival of new and genre expanding performers started by Celebrity Series in 2015. The series takes place at 160 Massachusetts Avenue on the Berklee College of Music campus.

Partial List of Stave Sessions Performers

 Becca Stevens Band
 Ben Sollee
 Brooklyn Rider
 Darcy James Argue’s Secret Society
 Gabriel Kahane
 Glenn Kotche
 Kate Davis
 Kneebody + Daedelus = Kneedelus
 Melissa Aldana
 My Brightest Diamond
 Roomful of Teeth
 Sam Amidon
 Sō Percussion with Buke and Gase
 Sybarite5
 Third Coast Percussion
 TIGUE
 Innov Gnawa
 yMusic

Past Programs

AileyCamp Boston
AileyCamp Boston is a six-week, summer day camp that combines dance instruction with personal development workshops, creative communication classes and field trips. Founded in 2000 and based on a structural model provided by the Alvin Ailey Dance Foundation as a template for camps across the country, the AileyCamp program is designed to help low-income students develop self-respect, confidence, discipline and imagination while fostering an appreciation for the joy of dance. The goal is not to train students to be professional dancers, but to challenge the participants and to strengthen their self-esteem. The camp celebrated its tenth anniversary at its closing performance on Thursday, August 6, 2009.

Boston Marquee
The Celebrity Series Boston Marquee series, which grew out of the Celebrity Series' Emerging Artists series, was inaugurated in the 2000-01 season. Boston Marquee sought to provide new creative opportunities for Boston artists and to offer new experiences for Boston audiences by commissioning new works, encouraging artistic collaborations and making resources available to artists. Among the artists who appeared on Boston Marquee are pianists Judith Gordon, Craig Smith, and Robert D. Levin, soprano Lorraine Hunt Lieberson, mezzo-soprano Jan Curtis, dancer Julie Ince Thompson, the Boston Trio, Sol y Canto, the Nicola Hawkins Dance Company, Rebecca Rice Dance, violinist Stefan Jackiw and Emmanuel Music. Though Boston artists remain an important part of Celebrity Series presentations, the Boston Marquee series was suspended prior to the 2008-09 season.

Collaborations
The Celebrity Series regularly collaborates with other Boston-area arts organizations to enrich Boston's cultural offerings. Most often these collaborations take the form of co-presentations. Past and present collaborative partners include The Wang Center for the Performing Arts, World Music , Broadway in Boston, Dance Umbrella, the Boston Early Music Festival, Boston Symphony Orchestra and the Handel and Haydn Society.

Memberships
The Celebrity Series of Boston is a member of ArtsBoston , the Association of Performing Arts Presenters (APAP), Boston Dance Alliance , Chamber Music America , Dance USA , Greater Boston Convention and Visitors Bureau , the International Society for the Performing Arts (ISPA)  , New England Presenters .

References

External links
Celebrity Series of Boston web site
Celebrity Series of Boston Blog
Boston Globe article, "Celebrity Series reverts to old name/" April 23, 2007

Culture of Boston
Non-profit organizations based in Boston
Cambridge, Massachusetts
Performing arts education in the United States
Performing arts in Massachusetts
Recurring events established in 1938
1938 establishments in Massachusetts